Westergaard  is a Danish surname, literally meaning west farm. Note that the double a is equivalent of å in common nouns and is retained from the pre-1948 orthography in proper nouns only. The form Vestergaard is a more common cognate. Notable people with the surname include:

Bjørn Westergaard (born 1962), Danish Olympic sailor
Harald Ludvig Westergaard (1853–1936), Danish statistician and economist
Harold M. Westergaard (1888–1950), Danish professor of theoretical and applied mechanics
John Westergaard (1931–2003), American stock analyst
Kurt Westergaard (1935–2021), Danish cartoonist
Niels Ludvig Westergaard (1815–1878), Danish orientalist
Peter Westergaard (1931–2019), American composer and music theorist
Marit Westergaard (born 1956), Norwegian linguist and language acquisitionist

See also
Vestergaard

Danish-language surnames